Quest for the Bay was a Canadian documentary television series which aired on History Television and the Public Broadcasting Service in 2002. It is the second entry of producer Jamie Brown's "Quest series", which includes Pioneer Quest: A Year in the Real West (2001), Klondike: The Quest for Gold (2003), and Quest for the Sea (2004). Frank and Alana Logie, a couple who had previously participated in Pioneer Quest, made a cameo appearance during the first episode. It was the highest-rated program on History Television in 2002 and received favourable reviews from newspapers—most notably, the Edmonton Journal. RoseAnna Schick, the sole female crew member, wrote a personal account of the journey for Manitoba History later that year.

The five-part series was produced by Winnipeg-based Frantic Films and was filmed during the summer of 2001. It followed an eight-person volunteer team (seven men and one woman) as they attempted to recreate the journey made by fur traders of the Hudson's Bay Company during the 1840s by travelling from Winnipeg to Hudson Bay. The trip covered a distance of 1,200 kilometres (800 miles) and took the team though the heart of the Canadian wilderness. The crew members possessed only equipment used during the period, down to their food and clothing, and included a replica of a  wooden York Boat.

Crew
Ken Albert, Jr. – 25-year-old power grid worker
Rob Clark – 45-year-old financial advisor
Geoff Cowie – 36-year-old University of Winnipeg student. Cowie was the great-grandson of an 1860s Yorkman trader.
Paul Gossen – 29-year-old wilderness guide
Marits Luinenburg – 42-year-old carpenter and sailor
Kevin Mustard – 45-year-old history teacher
RoseAnna Schick – 33-year-old publicist. She is the sole female crew member.
Randal Shore – 25-year-old university student

Episodes

References

External links

Quest for the Bay trailer

2000s Canadian documentary television series
2002 Canadian television series debuts
2002 Canadian television series endings
Historical reality television series
History (Canadian TV network) original programming
Television shows filmed in Winnipeg